The 1996–97 Liga Alef season saw Bnei Sakhnin and Hapoel Lod promoted to Liga Artzit as the respective winners of the North and South divisions.

At the bottom, Hapoel Migdal HaEmek, Hapoel Iksal (from North division), Maccabi Shikun HaMizrah and Hapoel Kiryat Malakhi (from South division) were all relegated to Liga Bet.

North Division

South Division

References
Liga Alef North IFA 
Liga Alef South IFA 

Liga Alef seasons
3
Israel